Narasimha is an avatar of the Hindu god Vishnu.

Narasimha may also refer to:

People 
 Saluva Narasimha Deva Raya (r. c. 1485–1491 CE), Indian emperor of the Vijayanagara Empire from the Saluva Dynasty
 Narasimha (Kalachuri dynasty) (r. c. 1153-1163 CE), Indian king from the Kalachuri dynasty of Tripuri
 Narasimhadeva I (r. c. 1238–1264 CE), Indian king from the Eastern Ganga dynasty
 Narasimha Rao, an Indian surname

Films
 Narsimha (film), a 1991 Hindi film, by N. Chandra, starring Sunny Deol and Dimple Kapadia
 Narasimha (2001 film), a 2001 Tamil action film directed by Thirupathisamy, starring Vijayakanth
 Narasimha (2012 film), a 2012 Kannada film

Places and structures
 Narasimha Konda, a hill near Jonnawada, Nellore district, Andhra Pradesh
 Narasimha Temple

See also
 
 Narashimhika or Pratyangira, a related goddess who saved Narasimha